SS Alice F. Palmer was a liberty ship built by California Shipbuilding Corporation of Los Angeles, Laid down on 12 February 1943 and launched on 12 March 1943 for the War Shipping Administration (WSA) with a hull# 726. Named for Alice Freeman Palmer, President of Wellesley College from 1881 to 1887 and Dean of Women at the University of Chicago from 1892 to 1895. Alice F. Palmer call sign was KKTF.  She was operated as a United States Merchant Marine ship by the American President Lines of San Francisco.  Alice F. Palmer was torpedoed and sank off Mozambique on July 10, 1943, during World War II.

Sinking
Alice F. Palmer loaded cargo and departed San Pedro on April 6, 1943. She arrived at Sydney, Australia on April 30. She departed on May 3 for Bombay, India and arrived on May 31. She departed Bombay on June 7 and arrived on June 11 at Colombo, Ceylon. On June 11 she departed for Calcutta India and arrived on June 17. On June 23 she departed Calcutta for Colombo Ceylon and arrived on June 28th. She departed for Durban, South Africa, where she was to load new cargo. Alice F. Palmer did not make it to Durban. In the Indian Ocean on April 6, 1943, she was torpedoed by German submarine U-177, the single torpedo hit the stern, blowing off the propeller and rudder. All the crew made it into the ship's lifeboats. After being torpedoes U-177, surfaced and signaled all the lifeboats to come alongside the sub. The U-177 leaders, commanded by Korvettenkapitan Robert Gysae, questioned the survivors of the ship, asking about cargo and destinations. U-177 then shelled the Alice F. Palmer to sink the ship more quickly. All four Lifeboat became separated in the Indian Ocean. Each lifeboat at some food, (pemmican, malted milk pills called Horlicks, crackers), fishing gear, sail for rain collecting and water kegs for emergency.

Lifeboat #1
On 29 July Alice F. Palmer'''s lifeboat #1, commanded by Bosun, with 15 crew members landed near Lourenço Marques in Portugal Mozambique. At Lourenço Marques they were able to get a passage to U.S. Naval facility at Durban, South Africa.

Lifeboat #2 
On July 26, 1943 lifeboat #2 with 11 of the merchants and 11 United States Navy Armed Guards landed on Bazaruto Island, Portuguese East Africa of Mozambique. The chief mate was in command of lifeboat #2. From Bazaruto Island, on July 28 a motorboat took them to Vilancula. On Vilancula they rested and treated the crew that were ill. On August 4 the crew walked from Vilancula to another small village, in the morning they walked to another small village. At this another small village, they were able to get a ride in a 1929 ford flatbed truck, to Inhambane. At Inhambane they stayed the night at a Catholic church dormitory. At Inhambane they were able to get a small passenger ship to Lourenco Marques. From Lourenco Marques they took a train to Johannesburg. From Johannesburg they were able to take a train to Durban, South Africa. They arrived on September 20, 1943 to Durban, which Alice F. Palmer'' was traveling to. A Durban they meet up with the crew of Lifeboat #1.
Armed Guard Navy Sailors in Lifeboat #2: Dale, Serna, Grasty, Walden, Williams, Bowman, Ellis, Hartman, Croke, Lisey and Ballack. Merchantmen in Lifeboat #2: Davis the chief mate, Howland the deck cadet, Aujong the 1st Asst. engineer, Kerwin, Scott, Miller, Fallon, Haller, Tenssey, Robertson and Beckett.

Lifeboat #3
On July 13, 1943, three days after the sinking Lifeboat #3 crew of 20 was spotted and picked up by a British Consolidated PBY Catalina flying boat 60 miles southeast of Madagascar.  The flying boat could not take off with the weight of all 20 men. So, the Catalina taxied as a boat the 60 miles to Madagascar. As she entered the surf the airboat broke, but all made it to the beach safely.

Lifeboat #4
Lifeboat #4 with a crew of 22 landed on the north shore of Madagascar on 30 July. Lifeboat #4 was command by ship's Third Mate.

Portugal Mozambique
Portugal Mozambique was neutral in World War II, as such the United States Navy Armed Guards changed out of their US Navy uniforms and into civilian clothes.  All the Natives and Portuguese people in Mozambique treated the crew very well, giving them places to rest and food.

References

 

Ships sunk by German submarines in World War II
1943 ships
Liberty ships
Ships built in Los Angeles